Mohammed Abul-Salam Onuka was a Nigerian soldier who served as Military Administrator of Edo State between December 1993 and September 1994. He took over from the civilian governor, John Odigie Oyegun, at the start of the military administration of General Sani Abacha.

Colonel Onuka made an attempt to develop the tourism potential of the scenic area of Ososo, but the effort was short-lived because of the sudden termination of the Abacha administration. From Okene in Kogi State and first cousin to the present Governor of Kogi State Yahaya Bello (APC).

References

Nigerian Army officers
Living people
Governors of Edo State
Year of birth missing (living people)